Goulbourne is a surname. Notable people with the surname include:

Elva Goulbourne (born 1980), Jamaican track and field athlete
Tyrell Goulbourne (born 1994), Canadian ice hockey player 
Stokeley Clevon Goulbourne (born 1996), American rapper and songwriter